"Panama" is a song by the American rock band Van Halen. It was the third US single released from the album 1984.

Composition
Musically, "Panama" has been described as glam metal, heavy metal, and hard rock.

Background
Despite its name, the song is not about the country. Instead, the song was reportedly written about a car. In an interview with Howard Stern, lead singer David Lee Roth explained the meaning behind the song. Although the song features some suggestive lyrics, it is about a car that Roth saw race in Las Vegas; its name was "Panama Express", hence the title of the song.

Panama was also the name of Roth's Opel Kadett.

Roth wrote the song after being accused by a reporter of "singing about only women, partying, and fast cars". He realized he had never written a song about fast cars and decided to write one.

In an interview with guitarist Eddie Van Halen, he said the song was musically inspired by AC/DC's straightforward three chord rock style.

During the bridge of the song where Roth says "I can barely see the road from the heat comin' off," Eddie Van Halen can be heard revving his 1972 Lamborghini Miura S in the background. The car was backed up to the studio and microphones were attached to the exhaust pipe to record the sound for the song.

The song is in the key of E♭ Major. However, the published score is in the key of E Major, having a moderate rock common time tempo of 144 beats per minute.

Music video
The music video for the song, directed by Pete Angelus, primarily features on-stage performances by the band. The bulk of the video was shot at The Spectrum in Philadelphia over two nights both during the show and at soundcheck. Portions of it were filmed at the tour dates prior during performances at the Providence Civic Center in Providence, Rhode Island.

The car shown in the music video is a heavily customized 1951 Mercury Eight convertible - notably not "Panama Express", the Opel or the Miura.

Reception
Chuck Klosterman of Vulture.com ranked it the fourth best Van Halen song, calling it the "strongest pure riff in the catalogue."

In popular culture 
The song was prominently featured in "Coma Guy," a 2020 episode of the animated TV series Family Guy, in which Peter mistakes the album 1984 for a book-on-CD of George Orwell's novel Nineteen Eighty-Four and becomes addicted to the song. It is also featured in Superbad during a parking lot escapade with McLovin’.

The song is also featured as in-game music for the video game Gran Turismo 4, with the song prominently featured in the game intro.

Personnel
David Lee Roth – lead vocals
Eddie Van Halen – guitar, backing vocals
Alex Van Halen – drums
Michael Anthony – bass guitar, backing vocals

Chart positions

See also
List of glam metal albums and songs

Notes

1984 songs
1984 singles
Van Halen songs
Song recordings produced by Ted Templeman
Songs written by Eddie Van Halen
Songs written by Alex Van Halen
Songs written by Michael Anthony (musician)
Songs written by David Lee Roth
Songs about cars
Warner Records singles